Cucumis picrocarpus is a vine in the family Cucurbitaceae that is native to Western Australia through parts of the Pilbara and Kimberley regions.

References

picrocarpus
Plants described in 1859
Flora of Western Australia
Taxa named by Ferdinand von Mueller